The Conklin Center for the Blind was founded in 1979 by Millard Conklin and the Lions Clubs of Florida. It is the only facility in the United States dedicated to training blind adults with multiple disabilities make a move toward independent living.

Prior to its merger with the Center for the Visually Impaired to form the Conklin Davis Center for the Visually Impaired in October 2020, the Conklin Center for the Blind was located at 405 White Street in Daytona Beach, Florida.

References

1979 establishments in Florida
Schools for the blind in the United States
Daytona Beach, Florida